The Hemitripterinae is a subfamily of the scorpaeniform family Agonidae, known as sea ravens or sailfin sculpins. They are bottom-dwelling fish that feed on small invertebrates, found in the northwest Atlantic and north Pacific Oceans. They are covered in small spines (modified scales).

Taxonomy
The sea raven subfamily Hemitripterinae, was first proposed as a taxonomic grouping in 1872 by the American biologist Theodore Gill. It has been treated as a family, the Hemitripteridae, within the Cottoidea superfamily but phylogentic analyses in the 21st Century place the grouping within the family Agonidae.

Genera
The following three genera are classified within the subfamily Hemitripterinae:

Characteristics
Hemitripterinae species are called sea ravens because early zoologists posited that their large pectoral fins may be used to fly in the air. Another name is sailfin sculpins, referring to their tall dorsal fins, in particular the very tall first dorsal fin of Nautichthys oculofasciatus. Their head and body are clothed with tiny “prickles”, these being modified, platelike scales each having one spine which is covered in skin. The frontoparietal ridge is knobby. The preoperculum has 3 or 4 spines which are mainly blunt and covered in skin. There are two dorsal fins, the first is supported by between 6 and 19 spines, the second by 11 to 30 soft rays. there are between 11 and 22 soft rays supporting the anal fin and the pectoral fin has a single spine and 3 soft rays. The lateral line canal is complete and contains more than 35 pores. They have both vomerine and palatine teeth. The gill membrane has a wide attachment to the isthmus and forms a fold across the throat. They do not have a swim bladder, In some species the males have external genital papilla. They have bands and other markings but the coloration can vary with habitat.

Distribution and habitat
Hemitripterinae sculpins are mainly found in the North Pacific Ocean, with a single species, the sea raven (Hemitripterus americanus) being found in the northwestern Atlantic Ocean.
200 m.

References 

Hemitripterinae
Agonidae
Taxa named by Theodore Gill
Ray-finned fish subfamilies